Radu Matei Drăgușin (born 3 February 2002) is a Romanian professional footballer who plays as a centre-back for  club Genoa and the Romania national team.

Early life
Drăgușin was born in Bucharest to Svetlana and Dan Drăgușin, both former Romanian internationals in basketball and volleyball, respectively. He has a younger sister named Meira, who also plays basketball.

Club career

Early career
Drăgușin was persuaded to football by his cousin, and joined the youth squads of Sportul Studențesc at the age of seven. He played at the club for four years before its dissolution, and then moved to Regal Sport București where he was teammates with Octavian Popescu and Luca Florică among others.

Juventus
In 2018, among interest from Chelsea, Paris Saint-Germain and Atlético Madrid, Drăgușin transferred to Italian club Juventus for a fee of €260,000. Initially assigned as an under-17 player, he quickly moved to the under-19 team. On 25 January 2020, midway through the 2019–20 Serie C season, Drăgușin made his debut for Juventus U23 against Pro Patria by coming on as a 36th-minute substitute for Raffaele Alcibiade.

On 8 November, he was called-up to the senior squad by Andrea Pirlo for a Serie A fixture against Lazio. He made his club and European debut on 2 December, appearing as a substitute in a 3–0 home victory over Dynamo Kyiv in the UEFA Champions League group stage. Drăgușin's league debut was made 11 days later, being brought on in the 90th minute for Matthijs de Ligt in a 3–1 away win over Genoa.

On 13 January 2021, Drăgușin started his first match in the Coppa Italia, as his side defeated Genoa 3–2 after extra time. His first career goal came for the under-23s on 13 February 2021, in a 3–0 away defeat of AlbinoLeffe. In April, Drăgușin's performances earned him a four-year contract extension at Juventus.

Loan to Sampdoria
On 31 August 2021, Drăgușin was sent out on loan to fellow-Serie A club Sampdoria for one season. He recorded his debut on 22 October, in a 2–1 league win over Spezia in which he replaced injured Valerio Verre in the 19th minute. Five days later, he played the full 90 minutes in a 1–3 loss to Atalanta.

Loan to Salernitana
On 31 January 2022, after his loan at Sampdoria was interrupted prematurely, Drăgușin moved to Salernitana on loan for the remainder of the season. He made his debut for them on 7 February, starting in a 2–2 draw to Spezia.

Genoa
On 14 July 2022, Drăgușin was loaned out to Serie B side Genoa with an option to buy. His transfer was made permanent for a fee of €6 million in January 2023.

International career
Drăgușin was selected by manager Adrian Mutu for the 2021 UEFA European Under-21 Championship, having previously made two appearances for Romania in the qualifiers. He only featured once in the final tournament, as he replaced injured Alex Pașcanu in the 63rd-minute of a goalless draw with Germany.

Drăgușin was called up to the Romania senior team for the first time in March 2022, and on the 25th that month made his debut by coming on in the 88th minute of a 0–1 loss to Greece.

Style of play
A tall and physical centre-back, Drăgușin has cited Virgil van Dijk as a point of reference, with whom he has since been compared to for his confidence in possession and positional sense. Drăgușin has also played as a right-back on occasion.

Career statistics

Club

International

Honours
Juventus U23
 Coppa Italia Serie C: 2019–20

Juventus
 Coppa Italia: 2020–21
 Supercoppa Italiana: 2020

References

External links
 
 

2002 births
Living people
Footballers from Bucharest
Romanian footballers
Association football central defenders
Juventus F.C. players
Juventus Next Gen players
U.C. Sampdoria players
U.S. Salernitana 1919 players
Genoa C.F.C. players
Serie C players
Serie B players
Serie A players
Romania youth international footballers
Romania under-21 international footballers
Romania international footballers
Romanian expatriate footballers
Romanian expatriate sportspeople in Italy
Expatriate footballers in Italy